Year 1255 (MCCLV) was a common year starting on Friday (link will display the full calendar) of the Julian calendar.

Events 
 By place 

 Europe 
 February 25 – Battle of Montebruno: Guelph forces under Thomas II of Savoy invade the Ghibelline territory of Asti (located in the Piedmont region), but he is defeated by the Astigiani army, led by William VII, at Garzigliana (Northern Italy). Thomas retreats and takes refuge in Turin; however, he is later captured by the Ghibellines.
 May – William of Rubruck from Constantinople returns to Cyprus from his missionary journey to convert the Mongols of central and eastern Asia, his efforts have been unsuccessful.
 Emperor Theodore II (Laskaris), who is in exile in the Empire of Nicaea, conducts a military campaign to recover Thrace from the Bulgarians.
 King Afonso III (the Boulonnais) moves his residence and royal court from Lisbon to Coimbra, which becomes the capital of Portugal.
 The Teutonic Knights in Prussia found Königsberg (modern-day Kaliningrad) and name it in honour of King Ottokar II of Bohemia.
 The lands of the House of Nassau are divided between the brothers Walram II and Otto I, not to be reunited until 1806.

 England 
 June – Battle of Bryn Derwin: Llywelyn ap Gruffudd defeats his two brothers Dafydd ap Gruffydd and  Owain Goch ap Gruffydd, to become sole ruler of northern Wales. Dafydd and Owain are both imprisoned.
 August – Following the death of Little Saint Hugh, in an instance of blood libel, eighteen Jews of Lincoln, are tortured and executed by royal command on suspicion of being involved in the boy's murder.
 A survey of royal privileges is conducted, which is included in the Hundred Rolls, a census seen as a follow-up to the Domesday Book (completed in 1086). The Hundred Rolls is later completed with two larger surveys, in 1274/75 and 1279/80.

 By topic 

 Art and Culture 
 The Gothic cathedral at Bourges in central France, is completed (it will become a UNESCO World Heritage Site).

 City and Towns 
 The town of Banská Bystrica (located in central Slovakia) is granted municipal privileges by King Béla IV of Hungary. 

 Market 
 Orlando Bonsignori, an Italian minor merchant, forms a consortium called the Gran Tavola ("Great Table"), which becomes the most powerful bank in western Europe. He becomes the exclusive banker for the deposits of the income of the Papal States.

Births 
 October 23 – Fernando de la Cerda, Spanish prince (d. 1275)
 Adolf of Nassau-weilburg, king of Germany (d. 1298)
 Albert I of Germany, Holy Roman Emperor (d. 1308)
 Andrey of Gorodets, Kievan Grand Prince (d. 1304)
 Bogislaw IV, Polish nobleman and knight (d. 1309)
 Dino Compagni, Italian historian and writer (d. 1324)
 Francesca da Rimini, Italian noblewoman (d. 1285)
 John of Paris, French theologian and writer (d. 1306)
 Margherita Colonna, Italian nun and abbess (d. 1280)
 Nicholas I, Bohemian nobleman and knight (d. 1318)
 William Ros, Scottish nobleman and knight (d. 1316)
 Sanjar al-Jawli, Mamluk governor and ruler (d. 1345)
 Sybille of Bâgé, countess consort of Savoy (d. 1294)
 Takaoka Muneyasu, Japanese nobleman (d. 1326)

Deaths 
 May 1 – Walter de Gray, English archbishop and statesman
 August 27 – Little Saint Hugh, English Jewish boy (b. 1246)
 Al-Faqih al-Muqaddam, Yemeni religious leader (b. 1178)
 Alice de Montfort, French noblewoman and ruler (suo jure)
 Batu Khan, Mongol ruler and founder of the Golden Horde
 Carintana dalle Carceri, ruler of the Principality of Achaea
 Denis Türje, Hungarian nobleman and military commander
 Eva de Braose, heiresses and wife of William de Cantilupe
 Helena Pedersdatter Strange, queen of Sweden (b. 1200)
 Majd al-Din ibn Taymiyyah, Seljuk judge and theologian 
 Masanari, Japanese nobleman and waka poet (b. 1200)
 Muhammad III, ruler of the Nizari Ismaili State (b. 1211)
 Shams al-Din 'Ali ibn Mas'ud, Mihrabanid ruler of Sistan

References